Félix Mathieu (born 15 October 1937) is a French cross-country skier. He competed at the 1964 Winter Olympics and the 1968 Winter Olympics.

References

1937 births
Living people
French male cross-country skiers
Olympic cross-country skiers of France
Cross-country skiers at the 1964 Winter Olympics
Cross-country skiers at the 1968 Winter Olympics
Sportspeople from Jura (department)
20th-century French people